Qeshlaq-e Seyf Khanlu-ye Yek (also Romanized as Qeshlāq-e Seyf Khānlū-ye Yek) is a village in Aslan Duz Rural District, Aslan Duz District, Parsabad County, Ardabil Province, Iran. At the 2006 census, its population was 249, in 45 families.

References 

Towns and villages in Parsabad County